The East Anatolian Fault is a major strike-slip fault zone running from eastern to south-central Turkey.  It forms the transform type tectonic boundary between the Anatolian Plate and the northward-moving Arabian Plate.  The difference in the relative motions of the two plates is manifest in the left lateral motion along the fault. The East and North Anatolian faults together accommodate the westward motion of the Anatolian Plate as it is squeezed out by the ongoing collision with the Eurasian Plate.

The East Anatolian Fault runs in a northeasterly direction, starting from the Maras Triple Junction at the northern end of the Dead Sea Transform, and ending at the Karlıova Triple Junction where it meets the North Anatolian Fault.

Seismicity 
The fault produced large earthquakes in 1789 (M 7.2), 1795 (M 7.0), 1872 (M 7.2), 1874 (M 7.1), 1875 (M 6.7), 1893 (M 7.1) and 1905 ( 6.8). The 7.1 earthquake in 1893 killed over 800 people.

From 1939 to 1999, a series of earthquakes progressed westwards along the North Anatolian Fault. But since 1998, there have been a series on or near the East Anatolian Fault. These started with the 1998 Adana–Ceyhan earthquake and include the 2003 Bingöl earthquake, the 2010 Elâzığ earthquake, the 2020 Elâzığ earthquake and the 2023 Turkey–Syria earthquake. The 2003 earthquake did not rupture along the East Anatolian Fault; it ruptured a perpendicular strike-slip fault. The 1971 Bingöl earthquake produced surface ruptures along the fault.

References 

 May 1, 2003 Bi̇ngöl (Turkey) Earthquake preliminary report (updated on May 13, 2003)

Further reading 
 
 
 

Seismic faults of Turkey
Strike-slip faults